is a former racing driver from Japan. He participated in the Japanese Grand Touring Car series in the top category between 1993 and 2002.

Kageyama won the inaugural Japanese Grand Touring Car championship, in the Nismo Nissan Skyline GT-R R32, before winning the next two championships.

He also won the All-Japan Formula Three Championship in 1989, and the Japanese Touring Car Championship in 1993.

Along with Nissan Motorsports teammates Aguri Suzuki and Kazuyoshi Hoshino, he drove a Nissan R390 GT1 to a third-place finish at the 1998 24 Hours of Le Mans.

Kageyama is the CEO of M-Proto Inc., a supplier of brake pads, based in Fujisawa, Kanagawa. His younger brother is Masami Kageyama, who also competed in JGTC and at Le Mans.

Racing record

Complete Japanese Formula 3000 Championship/Formula Nippon results 
(key) (Races in bold indicate pole position) (Races in italics indicate fastest lap)

Complete Japanese Touring Car Championship (-1993) results

Complete Japanese Touring Car Championship (1994-) results

Complete JGTC results

24 Hours of Le Mans results

References

External links

 Nissan driver profile 

1963 births
Living people
Sportspeople from Kanagawa Prefecture
Japanese racing drivers
Japanese Formula 3 Championship drivers
Formula Nippon drivers
Super GT drivers
24 Hours of Le Mans drivers
Japanese Touring Car Championship drivers
Motorsport team owners

Toyota Gazoo Racing drivers
Nürburgring 24 Hours drivers
Nakajima Racing drivers
Nismo drivers
Japanese Sportscar Championship drivers
Team Aguri drivers
Team LeMans drivers